Atila Hejazi (born 13 July 1976) is an Iranian retired football player and coach. He is the son of former Iranian football goalkeeper and manager Nasser Hejazi.

Early life
Hejazi was born on 2 June 1976 in Tehran, Iran. His father was Nasser Hejazi and his mother is Behnaz Shafie. He has a sister, Atoosa. He was admitted to Shahid Beheshti University in 1995.

Careers
He played for Esteghlal from 1997 to 1999. He joined Esteghlal Rasht in 2001, under management of his father and scored 3 goals in 2001–02 Iran Pro League for them.

References

External links

Attila Hejazi at Footballdatabase

1976 births
Iranian footballers
Iranian football managers
Esteghlal F.C. players
Zob Ahan Esfahan F.C. players
Living people
Machine Sazi F.C. players
People from Tehran
Association football forwards